The 2019–20 South Carolina State Bulldogs basketball team represented South Carolina State University in the 2019–20 NCAA Division I men's basketball season. The Bulldogs, led by seventh-year head coach Murray Garvin, played their home games at SHM Memorial Center in Orangeburg, South Carolina as members of the Mid-Eastern Athletic Conference. They finished the season 11–18, 6–10 in MEAC play to finish in eighth place. They lost in the first round of the MEAC tournament to Howard.

Previous season
The Bulldogs finished the 2018–19 season 8–26 overall, 5–11 in MEAC play, finishing in a tie for 9th place. In the MEAC tournament, they defeated Maryland Eastern Shore in the first round, before falling to Norfolk State in the quarterfinals.

Roster

Schedule and results

|-
!colspan=12 style=| Non-conference regular season

|-
!colspan=9 style=| MEAC regular season

|-
!colspan=12 style=| MEAC tournament
|-

|-

Source

References

South Carolina State Bulldogs basketball seasons
South Carolina State Bulldogs
South Carolina State Bulldogs basketball
South Carolina State Bulldogs basketball